Current Issues and Events (commonly known as Current Events) is one of several academic events sanctioned by the University Interscholastic League. The contest began in the 1990-1991 scholastic year, and has been conducted every academic year since then except for the 2019-2020 scholastic year, when the contest, among other UIL spring events, was cancelled due to the onset of the COVID-19 pandemic in Texas. The current state director is Bradley Wilson, PhD, a professor of mass communication at Midwestern State University in Wichita Falls.

Current Events is designed to test students' knowledge and understanding of significant events which have taken place during the current school year.

Eligibility 
Students in Grade 9 through Grade 12 are eligible to enter this event. All grades compete in one division.

The test covers current events which have taken place during the school year. For testing purposes, the following test ranges are implemented (2021) school year).

 District: August 17, 2020 – February 12, 2021
 Region: October 1, 2020 – March 27, 2021
 State: December 1, 2020 – April 29, 2021

Each school may send up to four students; however, in districts with more than eight schools the district executive committee can limit participation to three students per school. In order for a school to participate in team competition, the school must send at least three students.

Rules and scoring 
The test consists of two parts, a multiple choice section and an essay section. The multiple choice section consists of 40 questions. The questions may be answered in any order; there is no penalty for skipping questions. The essay section follows, which may include a quote or two and a prompt. The contestant must write an informative essay explaining the issue, while answering any questions in the prompt. Both sections must be completed in one hour; students who do not attempt the essay section are immediately disqualified. No time warning is given during the test; at the end of 60 minutes contestants must cease writing. The multiple choice section is scored first. Contestants are given one point for each question answered correctly, with no points being deducted for incorrect answers. After the multiple choice section is scored, the top eight students will have their essays scored. The essays are judged based on a holistic grading criteria of ten points. The multiple choice section and the essay section make up the student's individual points. For the team competition, the top three individual multiple choice scores from a school are added together.

Determining the winner 
The top three individuals and the top team (determined based on the scores of the top three individuals) will advance to the next round. In addition, within each region, the highest-scoring second place team from all district competitions advances as the "wild card" to regional competition (provided the team has four members), and within the state, the highest-scoring second place team from all regional competitions advances as the wild card to the state competition. Members of advancing teams who did not place individually remain eligible to compete for individual awards at higher levels.

For in individual competition; the essays of the tied contestants are judged against each other to break the tie.

For team competition, the score of the fourth-place individual is used as the tiebreaker. If a team has only three members it is not eligible to participate in the tiebreaker. If the fourth-place score still results in a tie, the individual tiebreaker rules will not apply, and all remaining tied teams will advance.

For district, regional, and state meet academic championship and meet sweepstakes awards, points are awarded to the school as follows:
Individual places: 1st—15, 2nd—12, 3rd—10, 4th—8, 5th—6, and 6th—4.
Team places: 1st—10 and 2nd—5.
The maximum number of points a school can earn in Current Issues and Events is 47.

At the state level, though no points are awarded, the third-place team is still draped with medals and a plaque just like the second and first place teams.

List of prior winners

Individual 
NOTE: For privacy reasons, only the winning school is shown.

Team 
INDEX: 1. State Gold Medalist Team Team

References

External links 
UIL Current Issues & Events Information Page
Official UIL Rules for Current Issues and Events
Official UIL Rubric for Current Issues & Events

University Interscholastic League